Paul Ruiz Mena (born 21 September 1962) is a retired male shot putter from Cuba. His personal best is 20.28 metres, achieved in May 1988 in Rostock.

Achievements

References

1962 births
Living people
Cuban male shot putters
Athletes (track and field) at the 1983 Pan American Games
Athletes (track and field) at the 1987 Pan American Games
Athletes (track and field) at the 1991 Pan American Games
Pan American Games silver medalists for Cuba
Pan American Games bronze medalists for Cuba
Pan American Games medalists in athletics (track and field)
Central American and Caribbean Games gold medalists for Cuba
Competitors at the 1982 Central American and Caribbean Games
Competitors at the 1986 Central American and Caribbean Games
Competitors at the 1990 Central American and Caribbean Games
Central American and Caribbean Games medalists in athletics
Medalists at the 1987 Pan American Games
Medalists at the 1991 Pan American Games
20th-century Cuban people